Radio y Televisión de Hidalgo is the state television and radio agency of the State of Hidalgo. It operates a radio network consisting of ten stations and a television network with six transmitters.

RTH was founded in 1982 and began broadcasting on TV that year, signing on XHPAH channel 3. Its Pachuca radio station came to air in December 1985.

Radio stations 
RTH is composed of 11 radio stations in 10 communities across Hidalgo:

Television transmitters 

|-

|-

|-

|-

|-

|-

In March 2018, in order to facilitate the repacking of TV services out of the 600 MHz band (channels 38-51), XHPAH (21), XHTHI (14) and XHTUH (22) were assigned new channels for continued digital operations.

References

External links

Public radio in Mexico
Public television in Mexico
Television channels and stations established in 1982
Television stations in Hidalgo